The 1889 South Dakota Coyotes football team was an American football team that represented the University of South Dakota as an independent during the 1889 college football season. They played 2 games and had a 1–0–1 record. It was their first season in existence.

Schedule

References

South Dakota
South Dakota Coyotes football seasons
College football undefeated seasons